T16 may refer to:

Automobiles 
 Gordini T16, a racing car
 Peugeot 205 T16, a rally car
 Peugeot 208 T16, a rally car
 Rover T16 engine, an automobile engine

Rail and transit

Locomotives 
 Prussian T 16, a steam locomotive

Stations 
 Kanzaki Station (Kagawa), Sanuki, Kagawa Prefecture, Japan
 Nangō-Jūhatchōme Station, Sapporo, Hokkaido, Japan
 Nishi-Kasai Station, Tokyo, Japan
 Nishiōji Oike Station, Kyoto, Japan
 Noe-Uchindai Station, Osaka, Japan
 Shiogama-guchi Station, Nagoya, Aichi Prefecture, Japan

Other uses 
 
 Machli (tigress), a Bengal tiger
 palawa kani, a constructed language
 T16 Carrier, a Canadian–built armoured personnel carrier
 T-16 Skyhopper, a fictional Star Wars vehicle